Kestanealan can refer to:

 Kestanealan, Arhavi
 Kestanealan, İnegöl